Prakash is a 2022 Nepali film directed by Dinesh Raut under the banner of Binish Entertainment Pvt. Ltd. The film was released on August 26, 2022. The story is based on the life of a man from rural Nepal who dreams of becoming a school teacher. Entire filming was done in Jumla. The film stars Pradeep Khadka, Deeya Maskey, and Renu Yogi, who made her debut through this film. Prakash was made on a budget of around 2.5 crore Nepalese rupees, which makes it one of the most expensive Nepali films.

The film was released simultaneously in eight countries, including India, Australia, New Zealand, Japan, the United States, Canada, parts of Europe, and parts of the Middle East. Distribution rights for these countries were sold for ₹1.72 crore.

Synopsis 
Prakash, played by Pradeep Khadka is an aspiring youth of Jumla, a rural district of Nepal who is preparing to become a teacher. He is survived by a widowed mother played by Dia Maskey supporting him to complete his academic qualification. However, due to his poor family background, he faces various struggles in his journey.

Cast 

 Pradeep Khadka as Prakash
 Deeya Maskey as Sita (Prakash's mom)
 Renu Yogi
 Prakash Ghimire
 Rajan Khatiwoda
 Amjad Prawej
 Dev Kumar Shrestha
 Hum B.C
 Prasant Shrestha
 Govinda Sunar

Production 

 Dinesh Raut - Director
 Mahendra Adhikari - Producer
 Bikash Subedi - Writer
 Rajesh Shrestha - Cinematographer
 Aashika Sharma - Production Designer
 Jeevan Thapa - Editor
 Tara Prakash Limbu - Music composer
 Alish Karki - Music composer
 Dipak Sharma - Music composer
 Subash Bhusal - Music composer

Soundtrack

Reception 
Nasana Bajracharya from Online Khabar rated the film 4 out of 5 stars. She praised Pradeep Khadka for his acting skills and ability to justify his character. She stated "Prakash is a refreshing film experience for the Nepali audience. It ditches a lot of the overused tropes and lets the scene, the character and the chemistry between them grow organically."

References

External links 
 

Nepalese drama films
2022 films
2020s Nepali-language films
Nepalese Civil War films